Jai Jinendra! (started in 7th CE) is a common greeting used by the Jains. The phrase means "Honor to the Supreme Jinas (Tirthankaras)"

The reverential greeting is a combination of two Sanskrit words: Jai and Jinendra
The word, Jai is used to praise somebody. In Jai Jinendra, it is used to praise the qualities of the Jinas (conquerors).
The word Jinendra is a compound-word derived from the word Jina, referring to a human being who has conquered all inner passions and possess Kevala Gyan (pure infinite knowledge), and the word "Indra," which means chief or lord.

Meguti Aihole Jain Inscription 
A slab on the outer east side wall of the Jain Meguti temple is inscribed in Sanskrit language and Old Kannada script. It is dated to 634 CE, and is a poem by Jain poet Ravikirti. He was in the court of king Pulakeshin II. This inscription opens with the equivalent of "Jai Jinendra" salutation in Sanskrit. The inscription is a panegyric by the Jain poet wildly praising his patron Pulakesin II.

The first verse reads:-"Victorious is the holy Jinendra ─ he who is exempt from old age, death and birth ─ in the sea of whose knowledge the whole world is comprised like an island. And next, long victorious is the immeasurable, wide ocean of the Chalukya family, which is the birth-place of jewels of men that are ornaments of the diadem of the earth." This 7th-century greeting remains a tradition among contemporary era Jains as "Jai Jinendra".

See also 
God in Jainism
Mahavira

Notes

References

Greeting words and phrases of India
Jain practices